The Tremont Theatre (1827–1843) on 88 Tremont Street was a playhouse in Boston. A group of wealthy Boston residents financed the building's construction. Architect Isaiah Rogers designed the original Theatre structure in 1827 in the Greek Revival style. The playhouse opened on 24 September 1827.

History
In the early part of the 19th Century, Boston was still a small town, not yet the bustling metropolis it is today. The town already had one playhouse, the Federal Street Theatre, and the city's small population made supporting a second theatre difficult. The owners tried to bring in patrons by booking big-name performers. These included Junius Brutus Booth, Charlotte Cushman, George Washington Dixon, Fanny Elssler, Edwin Forrest, John Gilbert, Charles and Fanny Kemble, and Thomas D. Rice. Nevertheless, the Tremont never turned a profit during its 16-year life.

Around 1829 Tom Comer served as musical director.

In 1841 leading British actors John and Charlotte Vandenhoff were in America. They had arrived in 1839 and appeared in New York and Philadelphia.
They appeared at the Tremont Theatre in a benefit for John Vandenhoff. Charlotte played Juliette and her father in his "very last role" played Mercutio and on the same night he took the title role in Coriolanus.

On 28 December 1843, the Free Church Baptists bought the theatre and renamed it the Tremont Temple. Although the building was largely used for religious events after this, it still served as the venue for public events on occasion.

Image gallery

See also
 Tremont Temple, est.1843

Notes

External links

Map: 
 Boston Public Library. Tremont Theatre Archives, 1839–1843

References
 Banham, Martin (1998). The Cambridge Guide to Theatre. New York: Cambridge University Press. Cf. especially p. 1122, article on the "Tremont Theatre".
 Kilde, Jeanne Halgren (2002). When Church Became Theatre: The Transformation of Evangelical Architecture and Worship in Nineteenth-Century America. New York: Oxford University Press. Cf. especially p. 142
 Savage, Edward H. (1865). A Chronological History of the Boston Watch and Police, from 1631 to 1865: Together with Recollections of a Boston Police Officer, or Boston by Daylight and Gaslight.: From the Diary of an Officer Fifteen Years in the Service. Boston. Cf. p. 82, &c.
 Shand-Tucci, Douglass (1999). Built in Boston: City and Suburb, 1800–2000. Amherst: University of Massachusetts Press. Cf. pp. 153, 177, 182, 207, 209, &c.

Theatres completed in 1827
1827 establishments in Massachusetts
1843 disestablishments in the United States
Former theatres in Boston
Greek Revival architecture in Massachusetts
19th century in Boston